Queen Inheon of the Neungseong Gu clan (Hangul: 인헌왕후 구씨, Hanja: 仁獻王后 具氏; 23 May 1578 – 10 February 1626), also known as Lady Gyewoon (계운궁, 啓運宮), was the wife of Grand Internal Prince Jeongwon and the biological mother of King Injo of Joseon.

Biography

Early life
The future Queen Inheon was born on May 23, 1578 as the fifth daughter and second youngest child of Gu Sa-maeng and his second wife, Lady Shin of the Pyeongsan Shin clan. She had nine siblings: three older brothers, four older sisters and one younger sister. It is said that because of the shared Royal blood the Queen’s parents have, they are the 5th great-grandchildren of King Sejong. Gu Sa-maeng through his 4th great-grandfather, Grand Prince Yeongeung, and Lady Shin through her 4th great-grandfather, Prince Gyeyang; as both princes were half-siblings.

Her paternal great-grandmother was Lady Shin of the Geochang Shin clan (Queen Shin’s niece and Queen Dangyeong's younger cousin), and her great-great-grandmother was Princess Gilan (a granddaughter of King Sejong the Great and Queen Jeongsun's cousin).

Her uncle, Gu Sa-an, married Princess Hyosun (second daughter of King Jungjong and Queen Munjeong) and her great-granduncle, Gu Mun-gyeong, was the husband of Princess Hwishin (only daughter of Yeonsangun and Queen Shin, and another younger cousin of Queen Dangyeong).

Marriage 
In 1587, Lady Gu married Yi Bu, Prince Jeongwon, third son of Seonjo of Joseon and Royal Noble Consort In of the Suwon Kim clan, thus becoming a sister-in-law to Princess Jeongmyeong and Grand Prince Yeongchang. She was titled Princess Consort Yeonju (연주군부인, 連珠郡夫人).

In March 1623, when her eldest son, Prince Neungyang, deposed Gwanghaegun and ascended the throne as King Injo, she moved into Gyeonghui Palace. After doing so, she was elevated to Princess Consort Yeonju (연주부부인, 連珠府夫人) but was eventually given Lady Gyewoon (계운궁, 啓運宮) as a separate title.

Death
Princess Consort Yeonju died on January 14, 1626, 4th year of King Injo's reign, at the age of 47 years old. Her tomb is located in Gimpo, Gyeonggi Province, South Korea and is known as Jangneung (장릉).

In 1632, she was elevated to Queen Inheon, after her husband, Grand Internal Prince Jeongwon, was posthumously honoured as King Wonjong of Joseon.

Family
 Great-great-great-grandfather 
 Gu Chi-hong (구치홍, 具致洪) (1421 – 1507)
 Great-great-grandfather
 Gu Su-yeong (구수영, 具壽永) (1456 – 1523)
 Great-great-grandmother 
 Yi Eok-cheon, Princess Gilan (길안현주 정경부인 이억천, 吉安縣主 貞敬夫人 李億千) (July 1457 – October 1519)
Great-grandfather
 Gu Hui-gyeong (구희경, 具希璟)
Great-grandmother
Lady Shin of the Geochang Shin clan (거창 신씨, 居昌 愼氏)
Grandfather
 Gu Sun (구순, 具淳) (1507 - 1551)
Grandmother
 Lady Yi of the Jeonju Yi clan (정경부인 전주 이씨, 貞敬夫人 全州 李氏)
Father
 Gu Sa-maeng, Internal Prince Neungan (구사맹 능안부원군) (1531 – 1604)
 Uncle – Gu Sa-an (구사안) (1523 – 22 April 1562)
 Aunt – Princess Hyosun (효순공주, 孝順公主) (1522 – 1538)
 Adoptive cousin – Gu Hong (구홍, 具弘)
Mother
 Stepmother – Internal Princess Consort Seowon of the Cheongju Han clan (서원부부인 청주 한씨)
 Shin Ji-hyang, Internal Princess Consort Pyeongsan of the Pyeongsan Shin clan (신지향 평산부부인 평산 신씨, 申芝香 平山府夫人 平山 申氏) (1538 – 1662)
 Grandfather – Shin Hwa-guk (신화국, 申華國)
Grandmother – Lady Yun of the Papyeong Yun clan (정경부인 파평 윤씨, 貞敬夫人 坡平 尹氏); daughter of Yun Hoe (윤회, 尹懷)
 Uncle – Shin Jab (신잡, 申磼) (1541 – 1609)
 Cousin – Shin Gyeong-ji (신경지, 申景祉)
 Uncle – Shin Geub (신급, 申礏)
Uncle – Shin Rib (신립, 申砬) (16 November 1546 – 7 June 1592)
 Aunt – Lady Yi (이씨)
 Aunt – Lady Choi of the Jeonju Choi clan (전주 최씨, 全州 崔氏)
 Cousin – Shin Gyeong-jin (신경진, 申景禛) (1575 - 1643)
 Cousin – Shin Gyeong-yu (신경유, 申景裕)
 Cousin – Shin Gyeong-in (신경인, 申景禋)
 Cousin – Princess Consort Shin of the Pyeongsan Shin clan (군부인 평산 신씨, 郡夫人 平山申氏) (1578 – 1622)
 Cousin – Lady Shin of the Pyeongsan Shin clan (평산 신씨)
 Uncle – Shin Hal (신할, 申硈)
 Siblings
 Older brother – Gu Seong (구성, 具宬) (1558 – 1618)
 Sister-in-law – Lady Jeong (정씨, 鄭氏)
 Nephew – Gu In-gi (구인기, 具仁基)
Nephew – Gu In-hu, Internal Prince Neungcheon (구인후 능천부원군, 具仁垕 綾川府院君) (1578 - 1658)
 Niece-in-law - Lady Hwang (황씨, 黃氏); daughter of Hwang Chan (황찬, 黃璨)
 Grandniece - Lady Gu (구씨, 具氏)
 Grandnephew-in-law - Han Jin-dal (한진달, 韓振達)
 Niece-in-law - Lady Lee (이씨, 李氏); daughter of Lee Yeong-hang (이영항, 李永恒)
 Grandnephew - Gu Mun-je (구문제, 具文濟)
 Grandnephew - Gu Mun-chi (구문치, 具文治)
 Niece-in-law - Lady Park Seung-ji (박승지, 朴承旨)
 Adoptive grandnephew - Gu Oh (구오, 具鏊)
 Unnamed daughter-in-law
 Grandnephew - Gu Heum (구흠, 具欽)
 Grandnephew - Gu Hoeng (구횡, 具鐄) (1538 - ?)
Nephew – Gu In-hak (구인학, 具仁壆)
Niece – Lady Gu (구씨, 具氏)
 Nephew-in-law - Yi Ho, Prince Punghae (풍해군 이호)
Niece – Lady Gu (구씨, 具氏)
 Nephew-in-law - Yu Chung-geol (유충걸, 柳忠傑)
Niece – Lady Gu (구씨, 具氏)
 Nephew-in-law - Park Rin (박린, 朴潾)
 Older brother – Gu Hong (구홍, 具宖)
 Older sister –  Gu Gyeong-wan (구경완, 具敬婉), Lady Gu of the Neungseong Gu clan (1563 - 1620)
 Brother-in-law –  Sim Eom (심엄, 沈㤿) (1563 - 1609); became the adoptive son of Sim Ui-gyeom
 Nephew -  Sim Gwang-se (심광세, 沈光世) (1577 - 1624)
 Nephew -  Sim Jeong-se (심정세, 沈挺世) (1579 - 1613)
 Niece-in-law - Lady Kim of the Yeonan Kim clan (1581 - 1604); Queen Inmok’s older sister
 Niece – Lady Sim of the Cheongsong Sim clan (청송 심씨, 靑松 沈氏) (1585 - 1658)
 Nephew -  Sim Myeong-se (심명세, 沈命世) (1587 - 1632)
 Nephew -  Sim Jang-se (심장세, 沈長世) (1594 - 1660)
 Nephew -  Sim Ahn-se (심안세, 沈安世) (1598 - 1616)
 Nephew -  Sim Pil-se (심필세, 沈弼世)
 Nephew -  Sim Hui-se (심희세, 沈凞世) (1601 - 1645); became the adoptive son of Sim Yeol
 Niece – Lady Sim of the Cheongsong Sim clan (청송 심씨, 靑松 沈氏)
 Niece – Lady Sim of the Cheongsong Sim clan (청송 심씨, 靑松 沈氏)
 Niece – Lady Sim of the Cheongsong Sim clan (청송 심씨, 靑松 沈氏)
 Older brother – Gu Yong (구용, 具容) (1569 – 1601)
 Nephew – Gu In-jong (구인중, 具仁重)
 Niece – Lady Gu (구씨, 具氏)
 Nephew-in-law - Kim Shin (김신, 金愼)
 Older sister – Lady Gu (구씨, 具氏)
 Brother-in-law – Hong Hui (홍희, 洪憙)
 Unnamed nephew
 Unnamed nephew
 Unnamed nephew
 Niece – Lady Hong
 Older sister – Lady Gu (구씨, 具氏)
 Brother-in-law – Gwon Yu-nam (권유남, 權裕男)
 Unnamed nephew 
 Niece – Lady Gwon
 Older sister – Lady Gu (구씨, 具氏)
 Brother-in-law – Kim Deok-mang (김덕망, 金德望)
 Unnamed nephew
 Unnamed nephew
 Unnamed nephew
 Unnamed nephew
 Unnamed nephew
 Niece – Lady Kim
 Niece – Lady Kim
 Niece – Lady Kim
 Niece – Lady Kim
 Niece – Lady Kim
 Older brother – Gu Gwing (구굉, 具宖) (1577 – 1562)
 Nephew – Gu In-gi (구인기, 具仁墍) (1597 – 1676)
 Niece – Lady Gu (구씨, 具氏)
 Nephew-in-law - Lee Ip-shin (이입신, 李立身)
 Niece – Lady Gu (구씨, 具氏)
 Nephew-in-law - Yu Gu (유구, 柳䪷)
 Younger sister – Lady Gu (구씨, 具氏)
 Brother-in-law – Yi Bak (이박, 李璞)
Husband:
 Wonjong of Joseon (조선 원종) (2 August 1580 – 2 February 1620)
Father-in-law – Seonjo of Joseon (조선 선조) (26 November 1552 – 16 March 1608)
Legal mother-in-law – Queen Uiin of the Bannam Park clan (의인왕후 박씨) (5 May 1555 – 5 August 1600)
Legal mother-in-law – Queen Inmok of the Yeonan Kim clan (인목왕후 김씨) (15 December 1584 – 13 August 1632)
Mother-in-law – Royal Noble Consort In of the Suwon Kim clan (인빈 김씨, 仁嬪 金氏) (1555 – 1613)

Issue(s):
Son – Yi Jong, King Injo (이종 조선 인조) (7 December 1595 - 17 June 1649)
Daughter-in-law – Queen Inryeol of the Cheongju Han clan  (인렬왕후 한씨) (16 August 1594 – 16 January 1636)
Daughter-in-law – Queen Jangryeol of the Yangju Jo clan (장렬왕후 조씨) (16 December 1624 – 20 September 1688) 
Son – Yi Bo, Grand Prince Neungwon (이보 능원대군, 李俌 綾原大君) (15 May 1598 – 26 January 1656) 
Daughter-in-law – Princess Consort Munhwa of the Munhwa Yu clan (문화부부인 문화 유씨) (27 October 1598 – 3 August 1676) 
Unnamed grandchildren
Daughter-in-law – Princess Consort Kim of the Yeongam Kim clan (부부인 영암 김씨) (1610 – 25 January 1696)
Son – Yi Jeon, Grand Prince Neungchang (이전 능창대군, 李佺 綾昌大君) (16 July 1599 – 17 November 1615) 
Daughter-in-law – Princess Consort Gu of the Neungseong Gu clan (부부인 능성 구씨)
Adoptive grandson – Yi Yo, Grand Prince Inpyeong (인평대군 요) (1622 - 1658); 3rd son of King Injo
Granddaughter – Princess Yi Yeong-eon (이영온, 李英溫)

See also
Wonjong of Joseon
Injo of Joseon
Queen Dangyeong

References

External links
 Queen Inheon in Doosan Encyclopedia 

1578 births
1626 deaths
16th-century Korean people
17th-century Korean people
Royal consorts of the Joseon dynasty
Korean queens consort
Neungseong Gu clan